Chowwera is a small town near to Aluva. It is part of Sreemoolanagaram panchayat, Aluva taluk, Ernakulam district in the state of Kerala, India.

Cities and towns in Ernakulam district